Museum for Art in Wood is an American educational wood art institution located in Philadelphia, Pennsylvania. It was officially established as a nonprofit in 1986 by brothers Albert and Alan LeCoff, following a series of international symposium from 1976-1986 presented by the LeCoff's with woodturner Palmer Sharpless.  The organization operated as the Wood Turning Center until 2011, when the nonprofit moved to its current location in Old City District of Philadelphia and changed its name to The Center for Art in Wood. As of January 30, 2023 the Center has changed ita name to Museum for Art in Wood. 

Today, the Museum presents changing exhibitions of contemporary art work in the medium of wood, a permanent collection of over 1,000 pieces and a host of educational programs and workshops.  The Museum also houses a research library, artists files, and a museum store.  A series of publications documents the Museum's work and highlights premier artists working in the field of wood turning and art in wood.

References

External links
Official site

Education in Philadelphia
Art schools in Pennsylvania
Arts organizations established in 1986
1986 establishments in Pennsylvania
Old City, Philadelphia
Museums in Philadelphia
Art museums and galleries in Philadelphia
Libraries in Philadelphia
Contemporary crafts museums in the United States
Woodworking